D-Unit was a South Korean girl group under the label D-Business Entertainment. The groups concept includes the addition of a new member with every promotion cycle. The group debuted as a trio consisting of Ram, UJin and Zin with a full-length album, featuring the title track "I’m Missin’ You" on August 1, 2012.
This was followed by their debut stage on August 2, 2012 on M!Countdown. In March 2013, D-UNIT added their first guest member, JNey, a member of GP Basic.

History

2012: Debut & Luv Me
On July 2, 2012, D-Unit released their first teaser of "I'm Missin' You" which featured member UJin.
On July 4, 2012, D-Business Entertainment officially stated that the group would be holding a fan signing in Japan before the group would make their Korean debut.
On July 10, 2012, the group released their second teaser which featured member Ram.
On July 16, 2012, D-Business Entertainment stated that the group would show their debut progress to fans through a reality TV show called "Welcome to D-Unit" and would air on July 18, 2012.
On July 29, 2012, the group released an official teaser which would feature all three members.
The following day on July 30, 2012, the group released an extended 1 minute teaser.

On August 1, 2012, D-Unit released their first album "Welcome To Business" and their first music video for their debut single "I'm Missin' You".
On August 2, 2012, D-Unit made their stage debut on M!Countdown performing their debut single "I'm Missin' You".
On August 2, 2012, released a dance version and dance tutorial for their single "I'm Missin' You"

2013: Sleeping In (Part 2) and Affirmative Chapter 1 Comeback
In late 2012, it was originally revealed that the group will add a member or two to the group at the end of December. Before debut, D-Business confirmed that the group will increase and decrease the number of members at different times. The decision to keep the three member unit for "Luv Me" was due to the fact that the group saw "Luv Me" as a continuation of their debut, therefore felt it was necessary to keep the current line-up. However, no members were added in December.

The group released a digital single "Sleeping In (Part 2)", a remix of the song "Sleeping In" from their debut album. It was confirmed before the release that the group would have a comeback in February. The first teaser image was released on January 29, 2013, teasing the appearance of a fourth member. The addition was revealed to be JNEY of GP Basic. Some fans of GP Basic were worried that this meant that GP Basic had disbanded, but Janey assured fans she would only be a member for D-Unit's "Affirmative Chap. 1" album. On February 10, a teaser was released which announced Zico of Block B composed and produced the title track. On February 11, D-UNIT released "Stay Alive" featuring Vasco. On March 4, D-UNIT released their second studio album, "Affirmative Chap. 1." In May, it was announced RAM would be filming a reality show with sister Boram of T-ARA and her father. After "Talk to My Face" promotions, the group released a pre-release single "Thank You" featuring Beenzino. JNEY returned to GP Basic in July 2013. To commemorate the group's first anniversary in August, a remix of "Before the Weekend Comes" from the first studio album was released. Also in September, RAM and Z.I.N performed in Vancouver, British Columbia for the "2K13 Feel Korea Festival". In September, Z.I.N released digital single "I Don't Want You To Enlist."

On December 6, 2013, the remaining members released a new single titled "It's You". The music video teaser featured former Seeya and 5dolls member, Soomi. However, the full video has yet to be released. Fans have speculated that D-UNIT has disbanded or began an indefinite hiatus.

Former Members
 U-JIN
 ZIN
 RAM
 JNEY (Guest member & GP Basic member)

Discography

Studio albums

Singles

Music videos

References

K-pop music groups
Musical groups established in 2012
South Korean girl groups
South Korean dance music groups
Musical groups disestablished in 2014
2012 establishments in South Korea
South Korean hip hop groups